Mike Bell (born March 16, 1963) is a former Republican member of the Tennessee Senate for the 9th district, encompassing Riceville, Bradley County, McMinn County, Meigs County, and Polk County. Prior to that, he was a member of the Tennessee House of Representatives.

Background and education
Mike Bell was born on March 16, 1963, in Cleveland, Tennessee. He graduated from Bradley Central High School, he then went on to graduate from Cleveland State Community College to further his education. He married Lisa Brumley Bell on June 8, 1985, together they have five children.  Mike bell is also Christian, as well as a small business owner and farmer. He was sworn in as state senator on January 11, 2011, after being sworn in he stated "Taking the oath of office is an incredibly humbling experience," "The people of the ninth district have entrusted me with a very important job, and I will work every day to earn the trust of all the people that I represent." This would be his first time as state senator however, he had previous experience in the House Of Representative serving two terms.

Voting history and Committees
Senator Mike Bell has served on his seat since 2011 and his term is set to end in 2022. Over the course of his career he has voted on over 100 bills including ones such as:

HB1264  - Voted yes, Bill to enact a concealed Handgun carry permit.

HB0632 - Voted yes, Bill to enact an award for teachers of five additional professional development points, if they went above their set goal for the year.

HB0164 - Voted nay, Bill to enact a law that prohibits any person from supporting or holding a cell phone while operating a vehicle.

Mike bell is also part of many different committees. He is a chair for the Senate Judiciary Committee, a member of the Senate Education Committee, a member of the Senate Government Operations Committee, a member of the Judiciary and Government Subcommittee of Joint Government Operations Committee, and a member of the Joint Government Operations Commerce, Labor, Transportation and Agriculture Subcommittee.

References

1963 births
Living people
People from Cleveland, Tennessee
Republican Party Tennessee state senators
Republican Party members of the Tennessee House of Representatives
21st-century American politicians